"I'm into Something Good" is a song composed by Gerry Goffin (lyrics) and Carole King (music) and made famous by Herman's Hermits. The song was originally recorded (as "I'm into Somethin' Good") by Cookies member Earl-Jean on Colpix Records in 1964. It entered the U.S. Cash Box Top 100 charts in the US on 4 July 1964 and spent 8 weeks there, reaching a high of number 42 on 15 August 1964, and number 38 Billboard.

On 26 July 1964, Herman's Hermits recorded the song as their debut single, reaching number one in the UK Singles Chart on 30 September 1964, and staying there for two weeks. The song peaked at number 13 in the US later that year and number 7 in Canada.  The 'A' section from the song is a twelve-bar blues.

Herman's Hermits' release at the height of the British Invasion came while Brill Building songwriters, Goffin and King in this case, found themselves in danger of obsolescence, as most of the British groups wrote their own material. The song has since been featured in films such as The Naked Gun: From the Files of Police Squad!, The Brave Little Toaster to the Rescue, and Ouija: Origin of Evil. The song was also featured in the season 5 episode "Road to Rupert" of Family Guy.

Carole King has said that in writing the song she was inspired by Brian Wilson: "I make no bones about it, that song was influenced by Brian's music".

Chart history
Earl-Jean/The Cookies

Herman's Hermits

Personnel (Herman's Hermits)
 Peter Noone – vocals
 Derek Leckenby – lead guitar
 Keith Hopwood – rhythm guitar
 Karl Green – bass
 Barry Whitwam – drums

Cover versions

The song was featured in the 1988 film The Naked Gun: From the Files of Police Squad!. From its inclusion in the soundtrack, a solo version by Herman's Hermits frontman Peter Noone climbed the adult contemporary chart that year.

The song was featured in the 1999 film "The Brave Little Toaster to the Rescue", in the opening credits and also when the Master puts the WFC 11-12-55 into Radio and turns him on.

Brian Wilson covered the song, which features Carole King, and it is included in the Best Buy edition of his 2008 album, That Lucky Old Sun.

The Bird and the Bee covered the song and released it as a single in March 2010. Their version was also included on the soundtrack for the film, Valentine's Day and television Love Bites show season 1 episode 6 "TMI."

On television, the sitcom The Partridge Family featured a cover version (lead vocal by David Cassidy) recorded in 1973, that was seen twice during the fourth season. The song (produced by Wes Farrell) was never officially released on either vinyl or CD.

Another version was recorded as part of The Langley Schools Music Project in 1976.

The Stool Pigeons covered the song in 1999 on their Herman's Hermits tribute album Rule, Hermania!.

Using the title "Something Good" Marianne Faithfull covered the song on her 2002 album Kissin Time. It featured Billy Corgan as a guest musician.

The song was included in the CD release of the 1982 album by Janis Siegel, "Experiment in White".

In 2020, the famous party band The Gypsy Queens recorded the song as the first single of their album "Reminiscing with Friends" (2022), in Los Angeles, at The Village Studios, Featuring the original Herman's Hermits lead singer Peter Noone, and produced by multiple Grammy winner producer Larry Klein. It was released 12 February 2021, under the label Sonico Productions.

In 2021, the animated series F Is for Family featured an unpracticed rendition of the song in season 5 episode 2.

Football song

The song, with adapted lyrics, has been adopted as an anthem by fans of Manchester United F.C. .

Herman's Hermits performance credits
Barry Whitwam has stated that the Hermits themselves played on the track, not Jimmy Page, since Mickie Most and former lead singer "Herman" (Peter Noone) had implied otherwise after having lost the rights to the band's name. Whitwam further states, in regard to exaggerations of songs on which they supposedly did not play: "Everything he says is that it was Jimmy Page, and Jimmy Page probably can't remember any of the songs that he played.  If you look at our top ten in America, "I'm into Something Good", it was us. All Hermits. There was only a piano added on. That was on a two track machine so we played at the same time. That got to number thirteen. “Can't You Hear My Heartbeat”, there were no other instruments. That got to number two. "Mrs. Brown You've Got a Lovely Daughter" got to number one. "I'm Henry the VIII".  Number one. "A Must to Avoid".  Number eight.  "Listen People". "Leaning on the Lamppost". That's six in the top ten with Jimmy Page or anybody else not involved! Another seventy of the tracks on the albums is only the Hermits. I think I worked it out, and I think in only thirty percent of all the songs ever recorded the Hermits didn't do the backing, but the Hermits were always on the vocals doing the harmonies. So he's trying to discredit us, saying that we didn't have anything to do with anything."

References

External links
 Herman's Hermits official website
 UK Official Charts
 
 
 

1964 debut singles
Herman's Hermits songs
Peter Noone songs
Songs with lyrics by Gerry Goffin
Songs written by Carole King
Song recordings produced by Mickie Most
UK Singles Chart number-one singles
Irish Singles Chart number-one singles
1964 songs
Pye Records singles
MGM Records singles
Columbia Graphophone Company singles